The International Coffee Organization (ICO) was set up in 1963 in London, under the auspices of the United Nations (UN) due to the economic importance of coffee. It administers the International Coffee Agreement (ICA), an important instrument for development cooperation.

It was a result of the five-year International Coffee Agreement signed in 1962 at the UN in New York City and renegotiated in 1968, 1976, 1983, 1994 and 2007 at the ICO in London. 

The International Coffee Council is the highest authority of the Organization and is composed of representatives of each Member Government. It meets in March and September to discuss coffee matters, approve strategic documents and consider the recommendations of advisory bodies and committees. 

The ICO's headquarters is located at 222 Gray's Inn Road in London and its current executive director is the Brazilian José Sette.

The United States officially withdrew from the International Coffee Agreement in June 2018. As of February 2, 2022 ICO Member Governments represent 93% of world coffee production and 63% of world consumption.

Membership
As 2 February 2022, its membership comprises 42 producing members and 7 importing members.

Exporting Member Countries

Importing Member Countries

See also
Economics of coffee

References

External links 

Agricultural organisations based in England
Coffee organizations
Coffee
Intergovernmental organizations established by treaty
International organisations based in London
Organisations based in the London Borough of Camden
Organizations established in 1963
1963 establishments in England
International agricultural organizations
Coffee in the United Kingdom